The swimming competitions at the 2014 Commonwealth Games in Glasgow, Scotland took place from 24 to 29 July at the Tollcross International Swimming Centre.

Participating nations
Nations with swimmers at the Games are (team size in parentheses):

 (hosts)

Results

Men's events

 Swimmers who participated in the heats only and received medals.

Women's events

 Swimmers who participated in the heats only and received medals.

Swimming medal summary

References

External links

Official results book – Swimming

 
2014 Commonwealth Games events
2014 in swimming
Swimming in Scotland
2014
Swimming competitions in the United Kingdom
Parasports competitions